Georgia's 36th Senate District elects one member of the Georgia Senate. Its current representative is Democrat Nan Orrock.

District officeholders

Notes

References

External links
 Senate District 36 at Georgia Senate

Georgia Senate districts